Washington J. Williams    was a professional baseball outfielder in the  American Association for the Richmond Virginians and in the National League for the 1885 Chicago White Stockings.

External links

Major League Baseball outfielders
Baseball players from Pennsylvania
Richmond Virginians players
Chicago White Stockings players
19th-century baseball players
Trenton (minor league baseball) players
Brooklyn Grays (Interstate Association) players
Wilmington Quicksteps (minor league) players
Richmond Virginians (minor league) players
Trenton Trentonians players
Oshkosh (minor league baseball) players
Milwaukee Brewers (minor league) players
Waterbury Brassmen players
Manchester Farmers players
Year of death missing
Year of birth missing